Bowral is the largest town in the Southern Highlands of New South Wales, Australia, about ninety minutes southwest of Sydney. It is the main business and entertainment precinct of the Wingecarribee Shire and Highlands. 

Bowral once served as a rural summer retreat for the gentry of Sydney, resulting in the establishment of a number of estates and manor houses in the district. Today, it is considered a "dormitory suburb" for commuter Sydneysiders, though it is 132 km away from the city centre. Bowral is often associated with the cricketer Sir Donald Bradman.

Bowral is close to several other historic towns, being  from Mittagong,  from both Moss Vale and Berrima. The suburb of East Bowral and the village of Burradoo are nearby.

History

Bowral's colonial history extends back for approximately 200 years. During the pre-colonial era, the land was home to an Aboriginal tribe known as Tharawal (or Dharawal). The first European arrival was ex-convict John Wilson, who was commissioned by Governor Hunter to explore south of the new colony of Sydney. Other people to traverse the area include John Warby and botanist George Caley (an associate of Joseph Banks), the Hume brothers and later famous pioneer explorers John Oxley and Charles Throsby. Governor Lachlan Macquarie of the New South Wales colony had appointed  to John Oxley in a land grant, which was later incorporated as Bowral.

The town grew rapidly between the 1860s and the 1890s, mainly due to the building of the railway line from Sydney to Melbourne. In 1863, a permanent stone building was built for the church. However, the building would be replaced by the first Anglican church of St Simon and St Jude. The church was designed by Edmund Blacket and was built on the glebe in 1874. The church was expanded in 1887 to cater for a growing number of worshippers. Today, only Blackett's belltower remains. One of the earliest houses built as a mountain retreat was Craigieburn which was constructed in 1885.

Gardens and European plants flourished from 1887, when citizens of Bowral started planting deciduous trees to make the area look more reminiscent of Europe and the British. This legacy still lives on throughout Bowral. Notably, the oaks at the start of Bong Bong St are a characteristic that makes Bowral distinct from other rural towns, giving it strong autumn colour. The town became somewhat affluent, as many wealthy Sydney-siders purchased property or land in the town and built grand Victorian weatherboard homes.

Heritage listings 

Bowral has a number of heritage-listed sites, including:
 Evans Lane: Kurkulla
 Glebe Street: Bradman Oval
 Oxley Drive: Mount Gibraltar Trachyte Quarries Complex

Etymology
Bowral and the former spelling Bowrall. may have been derived from an Dharawal word bowrel meaning "high".

Demographics

The 2021 census recorded Bowral's population as 10,764.

A more local area had a population of 10,335.

74.7% of people were born in Australia. The next most common countries of birth were England 7.0% and New Zealand 1.6% and 88.4% of people spoke only English at home. Aboriginal and Torres Strait Islander people made up 0.9% of Bowral's population. The most common responses for religion in Bowral were Anglican 26.2%, No Religion 24.2% and Catholic 22.7%.

In the 21st century, Bowral has become a haven for retirees and empty nesters, commonly from Sydney: 13.3% of Bowral's population is aged 55–64 years (compared with the national average of 11.8%) and 35.5% is aged over 64 years (compared with the national average of 15.8%). Consequently, the town has a number of retirement villages, some located only minutes' walk from the central business district and hospitals. Also, as measured during the 2016 census, 38.7% of the town's population are under the age of 45, whereas for the nation the figure is 59.4%.

Transportation

In the past, Bowral served as an overnight stop-over for travellers.

Bowral railway station is served by the Southern Highlands Line with services between Sydney and Moss Vale or Goulburn. Long distance services operate to Canberra and Griffith.

It has public bus routes to Nowra, Albion Park and Wollongong. A private operator provides a service six days a week from Bowral to Greater Sydney (Campbelltown, Liverpool and Parramatta) and to the Shoalhaven and south coast of New South Wales.

Climate
Bowral has an oceanic climate (Cfb), enjoying warm summers and quite cool to cold winters. Frost is common during winter and can even occur in summer. Snowfalls are rare, although falls in excess of 15 cm have been recorded. The rarity of snowfall is due in part to the foehn effect.

Tourist attractions

Bowral is noted for its boutiques, antique stores, gourmet restaurants and cafés.

The Bradman Oval, Bradman Museum and International Cricket Hall of Fame are dedicated to the achievements of cricketer Sir Donald Bradman and to the game of cricket.

Cecil Hoskins Nature Reserve, in the suburb's south, is a large picnic area known for its birdwatching.

Bowral is the setting for Tulip Time at the Corbett Gardens, a springtime celebration with a profusion of tulips and other flowers planted in the town centre. A comprehensive private not-for-profit botanic garden includes a mix of exotic, native, and endemic species including a shale woodland, the endangered ecological community endemic to the site.

The town has a Vietnam War Memorial and Cherry Tree Walk, constructed along the Mittagong Rivulet that flows through the town. Along a walking/cycle track beside the stream are planted 526 cherry trees, each dedicated to a soldier who died in the service of his country.

Bowral and surrounding region was proclaimed a book town in 2000, having numerous bookshops and associations with many literary figures including P. L. Travers, the author of the Mary Poppins novels, Arthur Upfield, and many others.

First held in 2016, each spring, Bowral hosts a popular cycling event: "The Bowral Classic", which draws hundreds of participants to compete. There are multiple races ranging from 35 km to 160 km.

The Bong Bong Picnic Races, commenced in 1886, attracted crowds of up to 35,000 but were suspended in 1985 and resumed in 1992 as a members-only event. The event attracts around 5,000 people and is held annually in November, as well as other events during the year.

Bowral is also home to a few vineyards and cellar doors and is close to Mittagong, the winery centre of the Southern Highlands. There are 60 vineyards in the Southern Highlands, which is a recognised cool-climate wine district. Wineries around Bowral are listed in the Southern Highlands Wineries Index.

Hospitals
The town is served by the Bowral and District Hospital, which also serves the Southern Highlands region. Founded in 1889, it is the only hospital operated outside the Sydney metropolitan area by the South Western Sydney Local Health District.

Bowral also has access to a private hospital operated by Ramsay Health Care, which includes short and long stay facilities although it lacks an emergency department.

Schools
Schools in Bowral:
 Bowral High School
 Bowral Public School
 Chevalier College (Burradoo)
 Oxley College (Burradoo)
 Southern Highlands Christian School (East Bowral)
 St Thomas Aquinas Catholic Primary School

Churches
Churches in Bowral:
 The Fields Church, an Acts 29 Network church
 St Simon's and St Jude's Anglican Church
 St Thomas Aquinas Roman Catholic Church
 St Andrew's Presbyterian Church
 Bowral Uniting Church
 Bowral First Church of Christ, Scientist
 Bowral Baptist Church
 Bowral Salvation Army
 Bowral Church of Christ
 Seventh-day Adventist Church

Notable residents
 Sir Edmund Barton: First Prime Minister of Australia
 Billy Birmingham: comedian, aka "The 12th Man"
 Sir Donald Bradman: Australian cricketer, the town's welcoming sign features a likeness of him getting ready to hit.
 Ita Buttrose: journalist, businesswoman, and Australian of the year 2013
 Jennifer Byrne: journalist and former book publisher
 Richard Carleton: former 60 Minutes reporter. Born in Bowral
 Lauren Cheatle: Lives in Bowral. Fast Bowler for Australia women's cricket team, NSW Breakers and Sydney Sixers.
 Bryce Courtenay: South African novelist
 G. F. J. Dart: headmaster of Ballarat Grammar School 1942–1970
 Andrew Denton: television producer, comedian, television presenter and former radio host
 Frank Debenham: Antarctic scientist and geographer
 Roy De Maistre: painter, born Bowral 1894
 Lorrae Desmond: actress (A Country Practice). Born in Mittagong
 John Fahey: former NSW Premier, federal parliamentarian, president of the (sports) World Anti-Doping Agency
 Peter Garrett: former Gillard Government minister and band member of Midnight Oil
 Scott Geddes: rugby league player
 Merv Hicks: Rugby league international
 Nathan Hindmarsh: Parramatta Eels captain NRL
 Geoff Jansz: television chef
 James Kemsley: cartoonist (Ginger Meggs)
 Graham Kennedy: "The King" of Australian television
 Peter Khan: former member of the Universal House of Justice, the supreme governing institution of the Baháʼí Faith.
 Elspeth McLachlan: neuroscientist, born in Bowral
 Geoff Morrell: artist, actor Blue Heelers
 John Olsen (Australian artist) 
 Paul Ramsay: businessman and philanthropist
 Craig Reucassel: television satirist, attended Bowral High School
 Leo Sayer: singer-songwriter
 Clement Semmler: author, reviewer and deputy general manager of the ABC
 Tim Storrier: artist, winner of the 2012 Archibald Prize
 P. L. Travers: author of Mary Poppins
 Arthur Upfield: author of the Boney detective novels
 Paul White: "The Jungle Doctor" medical missionary to Tanganyika, author
 Geordie Williamson: Mathematician specialising in representation theory
 Tim the Yowie Man, lived his formative years in Bowral from 1982–1990. Cryptonaturalist, author, tour guide, motivational speaker, tv personality, radio broadcaster.

See also
The New Empire Cinema

References

External links

 Wingecaribee Shire Council – Administering and Based in Moss Vale
 Information on Bowral and its History 
 BookTown Australia 
 

 
1860s establishments in Australia
Populated places established in the 1860s